José Míguez Bonino (Rosario, Santa Fe, 5 March 1924 – Tandil, 1 July 2012) was an Argentine Methodist theologian.

Biography

Bonino was raised in the Methodist Church, and participated actively in this denomination since his youth. He studied theology at a university in Buenos Aires between 1943 and 1948. He worked in church ministries in Bolivia, and after obtaining his degree he was a pastor in Mendoza. Bonino traveled to the United States to pursue a master's degree at the Candler School of Theology in Atlanta. In 1954, he became a professor of dogmatic theology in Buenos Aires. In 1958, he left teaching to pursue further study at Union Theological Seminary in New York, where he obtained his doctorate in 1960 with a thesis on ecumenism.

Bonino was appointed Director of the Evangelical Faculty of Theology in 1961, joining the Lutheran Faculty of Theology to form what is now the Evangelical Institute for Higher Theological Studies (ISEDET), where he served as director of postgraduate studies. Meanwhile, he was also senior pastor of the Methodist Church of Buenos Aires. During the Second Vatican Council he was the only Latin American Protestant observer.

Between 1961 and 1977, he was a member of the Faith and Order Commission of the World Council of Churches (WCC), and from 1975 to 1983 he was one of the members of the WCC Presidency. He was also executive secretary of the South American Association of Theological Institutions between 1970 and 1976. In 1994, despite not having party affiliation, he was elected to the Constitutional Assembly that carried out the 1994 amendment of the Constitution of Argentina, in which he participated especially in social and human rights issues.

Theology
Bonino was very influenced by the ideas of the social gospel. He criticized the social gospel for its theological weakness and utopian idealism that held that the kingdom of God is brewing in human history. He sought to link the biblical theological conception of the Gospel with social concern in the cultural sphere. The theology of Karl Barth was also significant in the development of his thought.

Bonino is considered one of the founders of Latin American liberation theology, and he was committed to a political ethic focused on the poor and the defense of human rights. He described liberation theology as "the response of a generation of young Catholics and evangelicals to the call of the Holy Spirit for a renewed spiritual, ethical and social commitment to the poor, the call for a new and integral evangelization."

He has advocated for community interpretation of the Bible against individualism.

Books

Notes

References
  This article includes content translated from this freely licensed work.
 

1924 births
2012 deaths
20th-century Methodist ministers
20th-century Protestant theologians
Argentine academics
Argentine theologians
Argentine United Methodist clergy
Candler School of Theology alumni
Liberation theologians
Methodist theologians
People of the World Council of Churches
Union Theological Seminary (New York City) alumni
Argentine expatriates in Bolivia
Argentine expatriates in the United States